The Quadrant House is a Grade II listed building situated in Durban, South Africa.

History 
The building, erected in 1929, was commissioned by H. Live and designed by architect Ritchie McKinlay. It is assumed that its original purpose was to be a naval training school.

Description 
The building is located on the Victoria Embankment in Durban's city centre. It occupies a lot with the shape of a quarter circle or quadrant, from which it derives its name. It is considered one of the epitomes of the so-called Berea Style, a local declination of the Art Deco style which emerged from local interest in Spanish colonial architecture as found on the West coast of North America.

See also 
 List of heritage sites in KwaZulu-Natal

References

External links
 
 

Buildings and structures in Durban
Heritage listed buildings and structures by country